The TopSky (formerly EUROCAT)  system is a computerised air traffic control and management solution developed by Thales Air Systems (formerly Thomson CSF). It utilises a distributed computing architecture and is capable of integrating geographically dispersed air traffic control units within a Flight Information Region (e.g. control towers at different airports and en route control centres) into a single coherent system.

During 2012, the Thales marketing name has been changed from Eurocat to TopSky.

Features

TopSky handles a large variety of different functions required for the smooth operation of air traffic control and management. A non-exhaustive list includes:

Surveillance data processing and track correlation (radar, ADS-B, ADS-C etc.)
Flight plan processing
Communication (CPDLC etc.)
Aeronautical information data processing (NOTAMs, QNH, wind aloft etc.)
Flow control and sequencing
Human-machine interfacing (e.g. correlating data to generate controller's display)
Data recording
Controller situational awareness and alerts generation
Squawk Emergency (EMG), Radio Failure (RAD), Hijack (HIJ)
Short Term Conflict Alert (STCA), Minimum Safe Altitude Warning (MSAW), Danger Area Infringement Warning (DAIW) etc.
Non-Transgression Zone (NTZ) alert, DUPE Alerts, FPCF Alerts.

Countries
The software is used in many countries, including:

 Algeria
 Australia
 Austria
 Belgium
 Brunei
 Croatia
 Czech Republic
 Denmark
 Dominican Republic
 Egypt
 Finland
 France
 Greece
 Hungary
 Ireland
 Jamaica
 Kenya
 Portugal
 Philippines
 Saudi Arabia
 Singapore
 South Africa
 Sweden
 United Kingdom
 Thailand
 Tanzania

References

Air traffic control in Europe
Air traffic control systems